The Goodbye People is a 1984 American comedy-drama film written and directed by Herb Gardner, based on his 1968 play The Goodbye People. The film stars Judd Hirsch, Martin Balsam, Pamela Reed, Vincent Gugleotti, Gene Saks and Ron Silver. First screened at the Toronto International Film Festival in 1984, the film was released on January 31, 1986, by Embassy Pictures (by a fitting coincidence, it would be their final theatrical release before the company was merged into Columbia Pictures).

Plot

Cast      
Judd Hirsch as Arthur Korman
Martin Balsam as Max Silverman
Pamela Reed as Nancie Scot
Vincent Gugleotti as Irwin Abrams
Gene Saks as Marcus Soloway
Ron Silver as Eddie Bergson
Sammy Smith as George Mooney
James Trotman as Velasquez
Michael Tucker as Michael Silverman
Sid Winter as The Jogger

Critical reception
The Variety reviewer wrote: "Based on his late 1960s stage flop of the same name, neither time nor the transferal of media has improved the story of three eccentric losers who band together in hopes of changing their luck... The uneasy alliance between the characters is treated in a glib fashion by Gardner." The reviewer for People wrote: "The three make a wonderfully human trio, playing off and to each other's eccentricities with warmth and humor. First-time director Herb Gardner, who also wrote the play of the same name, proves equally adept behind the pen and the camera... the movie, shot on location, offers a beautifully nostalgic portrait of Coney Island, the skeletons of its once-monumental attractions creating a dual sense of foreboding and serenity. 'The Goodbye People' meets these contradictions head-on, turning a story of life and death into a witty celebration of spirit."

References

External links
 
 

1984 films
1984 comedy-drama films
American comedy-drama films
American films based on plays
Films set in Brooklyn
Films shot in New York City
Embassy Pictures films
1984 directorial debut films
1980s English-language films
1980s American films